The 1958–59 season saw the previous season's Third Division North and South consolidated into Third and Fourth Divisions. Newport County's top-half finish qualified them for the Third Division. This was County's second season in the division as they were founder members of the Third Division before the regional split for the 1921–22 season.

Season review

Results summary

Results by round

Fixtures and results

Third Division

FA Cup

Welsh Cup

League table

References

 Amber in the Blood: A History of Newport County.

External links
 Newport County 1958-1959 : Results
 Newport County football club match record: 1959
 Welsh Cup 1958/59

1958-59
English football clubs 1958–59 season
1958–59 in Welsh football